The 1949–50 Hong Kong First Division League season was the 39th since its establishment.

League table

References
1949–50 Hong Kong First Division table (RSSSF)

Hong Kong First Division League seasons
Hong
football